For the town in Guinea see Doura, Guinea; for the Palestinian town in Hebron, see Dura, Hebron; for the neighborhood in Baghdad, see Dora, Baghdad.
 
Doura is a village and seat of the commune of N'Koumandougou in the Ségou Cercle in the Ségou Region of southern-central Mali.

References

Populated places in Ségou Region